Inka Raqay or Inkaraqay (Quechua Inka Inca, raqay ruin, a demolished building;  shed, storehouse or dormitory for the laborers of a farm;  a generally old building without roof, only with walls, also spelled Inca Racay, Inka Racay, Inka Raccay, Inca Raccay, Incaracay, Incaraccay, Incarracay) may refer to:

 Inka Raqay, Apurímac, an archaeological site in the Apurímac Region, Peru
 Inka Raqay, Ayacucho, an archaeological site in the Ayacucho Region, Peru
 Inka Raqay, Bolivia, an archaeological site in the Cochabamba Department, Bolivia